Qaz is a village in Karrab Rural District, in the Central District of Sabzevar County, Razavi Khorasan Province, Iran. At the 2006 census, its population was 377, in 126 families.

References 

Populated places in Sabzevar County